Top Country Albums is a chart that ranks the top-performing country music albums in the United States, published by Billboard.  In 2001, 13 different albums topped the chart, based on electronic point of sale data provided by SoundScan Inc.

In the issue of Billboard dated January 6, Tim McGraw was at number one with his album Greatest Hits, its fifth week in the top spot.  It spent the first five weeks of 2001 atop the listing before being displaced by the soundtrack album of the film Coyote Ugly.  McGraw returned to the top spot in May with Set This Circus Down and was the only act with two number ones during the year.  Two other greatest hits albums reached number one in 2001.  In October, Martina McBride reached number one with her album simply entitled Greatest Hits; it was her first album to top the chart.  The following month, Reba McEntire, one of the most successful female singers in country music history, reached the peak position with her third such release, Greatest Hits Volume III: I'm a Survivor.  In addition to McBride, the band Lonestar reached number one for the first time in 2001, spending a single week in the top spot in July with I'm Already There, and Toby Keith achieved the same feat two months later with Pull My Chain.

In February, the soundtrack album of the film O Brother, Where Art Thou? reached number one; by the end of the year it had spent 24 weeks in the top spot in six different spells.  The soundtrack, curated and produced by T Bone Burnett, used bluegrass and folk music styles appropriate to the film's Great Depression-era setting and unexpectedly became a great success.  It would go on to spend a total of 35 weeks atop the country albums chart and reach number one on the all-genre Billboard 200 early in 2002, shortly after it won the Grammy Award for Album of the Year.  The year's final chart-topper was Scarecrow by Garth Brooks, which entered the chart at number one in the issue of Billboard dated December 1, and was atop the listing for the final five weeks of the year.  It was the 11th chart-topper since 1990 for one of the most successful recording artists in history.

Chart history

References

2001
2001 record charts